James Levesque "Jim" Shaver Jr. (November 23, 1927 – May 27, 2021) was an American politician. He was a member of the Arkansas House of Representatives, serving from 1961 to 1994. He also served from 1968 to 1971 as an assistant to Attorney General Joe Purcell. He was a member of the Democratic party.

He was the son of former Arkansas Lieutenant Governor James L. Shaver and his wife, Louise Davis. In 1949, he married the former Bonnie Wood, and they enjoyed 52 years of marriage until her death in 2001. Bonnie and Jim were loving parents to a son, Jimmy, who died in 1978 and a daughter, Bonnie Sue Shaver Huff, who currently resides in Wynne. They also have two grandsons – Michael and Jimmy – and five great-grandsons – Michael, Evan, Shaver, William and Tanner. Jim is lovingly known as “Poppy” to these generations, most of whom were, or currently are, being raised in Wynne or being raised to know and love the community.

References
American Legislative Leaders in the South, 1911-1994
https://www.amazon.com/American-Legislative-Leaders-South-1911-1994/dp/0313302138

1927 births
2021 deaths
People from Wynne, Arkansas
20th-century American politicians
Speakers of the Arkansas House of Representatives
Democratic Party members of the Arkansas House of Representatives